Steve Cedorchuk is an American former ice hockey player and coach. He spent more than 20 years affiliated with Boston College

Head coaching record

References

External links
 

Living people
American ice hockey coaches
American men's ice hockey defensemen
Boston College Eagles men's ice hockey coaches
Boston College Eagles men's ice hockey players
Ice hockey coaches from Massachusetts
People from Charlestown, Boston
Ice hockey players from Massachusetts
1947 births